Pavel Serafimovich Lednyov (25 March 1943, Nizhny Novgorod, Russia – 23 November 2010, Moscow, Russia) was a Russian modern pentathlete and Olympic Champion. He won a total of seven Olympic medals in modern pentathlon, more than any other player to date. He won four individual World Championships, and two gold medals as a member of the Soviet team.

Career
Lednyov competed in 1968, 1972, 1976 and 1980 Summer Olympics, and won a total of two gold medals, two silver medals, and three bronze medals.

Lednyov became Soviet champion in 1968 and qualified for the Summer Olympics in Mexico City. At his first Olympic games, he won an individual bronze medal, and a silver medal with the Soviet team, which consisted of Lednyov, Boris Onishchenko, and Stasys Šaparnis. In Munich in 1972, he won a silver medal in the individual competition, behind András Balczó, and an Olympic gold medal in the team competition, together with Boris Onishchenko and Vladimir Shmelyov.

In London in 1973, Lednyov became double World Champion, by winning the individual competition with 5,412 points, 145 points ahead of Shmelyov, and the Soviet team won the team competition before West Germany. In 1973 he also became a national champion for the second time. He became a double World Champion again in 1974, and in 1975 he became an individual World Champion for the third time.

At the 1976 Summer Olympics in Montreal, he won an individual silver medal, behind gold winner Janusz Pyciak-Peciak. In 1978 he became World Champion again, his fourth in the individual competition. At the 1980 Summer Olympics in Moscow, he won an individual bronze medal, and also his second Olympic gold medal with the Soviet team, together with Anatoli Starostin and Yevgeny Lipeyev.

Awards
Lednyov was listed among the Soviet Union top ten athletes of the year by the Federation of Sports Journalists of the USSR in 1973 and 1975.

References

1943 births
2010 deaths
Soviet male modern pentathletes
Russian male modern pentathletes
Olympic modern pentathletes of the Soviet Union
Modern pentathletes at the 1968 Summer Olympics
Modern pentathletes at the 1972 Summer Olympics
Modern pentathletes at the 1976 Summer Olympics
Modern pentathletes at the 1980 Summer Olympics
Olympic gold medalists for the Soviet Union
Olympic silver medalists for the Soviet Union
Olympic bronze medalists for the Soviet Union
Olympic medalists in modern pentathlon
Medalists at the 1980 Summer Olympics
Medalists at the 1976 Summer Olympics
Medalists at the 1972 Summer Olympics
Medalists at the 1968 Summer Olympics
World Modern Pentathlon Championships medalists
Burials in Troyekurovskoye Cemetery